Dan Way (born 5 April 1987, Swindon) is an English former rugby union player for Newport RFC and the Newport Gwent Dragons regional team. He previously played for Pontypool RFC and Ebbw Vale RFC. A prop forward, Way made his debut for Newport Gwent Dragons against Gloucester 4 November 2010. Way retired from rugby in July 2015 due to a recurring shoulder injury.

References

External links
Newport Gwent Dragons profile

1987 births
Living people
Dragons RFC players
English rugby union players
Newport RFC players
Rugby union players from Swindon